"Storm in the Heartland" is a song written by Billy Henderson, Curt Ryle and Donald Burns, and recorded by American country music artist Billy Ray Cyrus.  It was released in October 1994 as the first single and title track from the album Storm in the Heartland.  The song reached #33 on the Billboard Hot Country Singles & Tracks chart.

Chart performance

References

1994 singles
1994 songs
Billy Ray Cyrus songs
Mercury Records singles